Live at Montreux 2001 is the first live album by American hip-hop group Run-D.M.C. Officially released on April 3, 2007 through Eagle Records, it was produced and mixed by Jam Master Jay. The concert was performed on July 21, 2001 in Montreux, Switzerland.

Musically, the album features aggressive takes on the group's catalog of greatest hits, with the performances filled with banter with the crowd and various call-and-response antics.

Track listing
"Intro"
"It's Like That"
"It's Tricky"
"Medley: Rock Box / Sucker M.C.'s / Freestyle / Here We Go / Beats to the Rhyme"
"King of Rock"
"Interlude"
"Mary, Mary"
"Walk This Way" (feat. Aerosmith)
"School of Old"
"It's Over"
"Run's Freestyle"
"Peter Piper"
"Down with the King"

Reviews and response
Music critic David Jeffries praised the album for the publication AllMusic. He wrote, "Live at Montreux 2001 is an exciting and generally satisfying release, filled with life, energy, and inspiration." Remarking that "[g]olden-age material is the name of the game", he stated that the group's antics make it ideal for "hardcore fans", particularly with "the drama-building intro" going "past the four-minute mark without trying the patience".

See also
 Golden age hip-hop
 Run-D.M.C. discography

References

External links
Official band website

Run-DMC albums
2007 live albums
Live hip hop albums